Djamila or Jamila (7th-century – d. 720) was a Medinan Qiyan-courtesan musician, singer and poet. 

She was a mawla of Banu Sulaym tribe, which mean she was a freedwoman-client who converted to Islam, which was the usual background for free professional musical artists in the Caliphate. 

She and her colleague Azza al-Mayla (d. 705) was one of only two free female musicians known to have managed their own majlis, which was a form of entertainment sessions or salon which was at this time still acceptable for women and men to attend together, as Arabian upper-class women was not yet fully subjected to gender segregation. The majlis played a big role in the lively musical life of Medina, in which the musicians performed and attracted patrons and students.

She was renowned for her high artistic achievements as well as for her acts as an educator of celebrated male musicians. One of her students was the musician Ma'bad (d. 743), the son of an enslaved African, said of her "in the art of music Djamila is the tree and we are the branches".

Djamila performed a pilgrimage from Medina to Mecca, which was a musical event which attracted great attention and extensively commented on by contemporary accounts.  Her cortege included all the principal musicians of the time, as well as 50 singing girls, was detained because of the attention from the onlookers, and her return was the occasion of three days of musical feasts.

References

8th-century women musicians
8th-century musicians
Arabian slaves and freedmen
Medieval singers
Qiyan
720 deaths
7th-century musicians
Women poets from the Umayyad Caliphate
Slaves from the Umayyad Caliphate
People from Medina
Medieval Arabic singers